Jetsonville is a rural locality in the local government area (LGA) of Dorset in the North-east LGA region of Tasmania. The 2016 census recorded a population of 137 for the state suburb of Jetsonville.

History 
Jetsonville was gazetted as a locality in 1964. It was named for a family called Jetson who owned land in the area from 1860. The name was in official use by 1879, by which date a school had opened. 

Initially it was a mining area but soon became a farming centre.

Geography
The Brid River forms part of the south-western boundary before flowing through to the north-west.

Road infrastructure 
Route B84 (Bridport Road) passes through from south-east to north.

References

Towns in Tasmania
Localities of Dorset Council (Australia)